This article presents a list of the historical events and publications of Australian literature during 1875.

Books 

 Rolf Boldrewood — The Squatter's Dream : A Story of Australian Life
 Ada Cambridge — Up the Murray
 Marcus Clarke — 'Twixt Shadow and Shine
 B. L. Farjeon
 At the Sign of the Silver Flagon
 An Island Pearl : A Christmas Story
 Maud Jean Franc — Hall's Vineyard
 W. Clark Russell — John Holdsworth, Chief Mate
 James Brunton Stephens — A Hundred Pounds

Poetry 

 Ada Cambridge — The Manor House and Other Poems
 Henry Kendall — "Mooni"
 James Brunton Stephens
 "From an Upper Verandah"
 "Quart Pot Creek"

See also 

 1875 in poetry
 List of years in literature
 List of years in Australian literature
 1875 in literature
 1874 in Australian literature
 1875 in Australia
 1876 in Australian literature

References

Literature
Australian literature by year
19th-century Australian literature
1875 in literature